Wireless Network organizations sorted by size to have a better overview of the size of these organizations around the globe and to determine which networks are tiny and which are not.

 Athens_Wireless_Metropolitan_Network - 800
 TWMN - 503
 Pretoria Wireless Users Group - 455
 Jawug - 330
 Patras_wireless_metropolitan_network - 250
 Heraklion Student Wireless Network - 150
 Patras_Wireless_Network - 150
 Melbourne Wireless - 150
 Personal_Telco - 100
 Wireless_Leiden - 71
 Cape Town Wireless User Group (CTWUG) - 70
 Ioannina Wireless Network - 40
 TasWireless - 37
 Seattle Wireless - 30

Unknown 

 AirJaldi - 2000 computers linked
 BWIC
 Champaign-Urbana Community Wireless Network
 Clermont_Sans_Fil
 Melbourne_Wireless
 NYCwireless
 Outernet_(network)
 Wireless_Toronto
 Vancouver_Community_Network

Wireless network organizations